Alex Guerrero may refer to:

Alex Guerrero (alternative medicine), American alternative medicine practitioner known for his infomercials and work with professional football players
Alex Guerrero (baseball), Cuban-born professional baseball player
Alex Guerrero (lineman), American professional football lineman